César Maximiliano Asís (born 27 March 1987) is an Argentinian former footballer.

Club career
He started career at youth level with FC Porto but when he turned professional in 2005 he was signed by Boca Juniors but since his arrival he hasn't had the best spells and has been loaned out to Emelec of Ecuador and Portimonense of Portugal in July 2008.

References

External links
 FC Inter Turku Profile

1987 births
Living people
Argentine footballers
Association football midfielders
C.S. Emelec footballers
FC Inter Turku players
Boca Juniors footballers
Portimonense S.C. players
Veikkausliiga players
Argentine expatriate footballers
Expatriate footballers in Ecuador
Argentine expatriate sportspeople in Ecuador
Expatriate footballers in Finland
Argentine expatriate sportspeople in Finland
Expatriate footballers in Portugal
Argentine expatriate sportspeople in Portugal
Sportspeople from San Miguel de Tucumán